Pollenia venturii is a species of cluster fly in the family Polleniidae.

Distribution
France, Germany, Greece, Iran, Italy, Netherlands, Poland, Russia.

References

Polleniidae
Insects described in 1956
Diptera of Europe